Blesk is a daily tabloid newspaper published in Prague, the Czech Republic. Its name translates as lightning.

History and profile
Blesk was first published on 14 April 1991. In 1992, it launched a weekly edition published on Sundays and its magazine, which is a comprehensive TV guide, was started in 1993. The paper is headquartered in Prague and was owned by Ringier until December 2013. Its owner is the Czech News Center (CNC) and its publisher is the Czech Print Center, a subsidiary of the CNC.

Its lay-out is modelled from the Swiss tabloid Blick, also published by Ringier, and the German daily Bild which is published by Axel Springer SE. Thus, Blesk is a tabloid newspaper and is neutral in its political and religious leaning.

The daily's sister paper is Aha!, another tabloid. Vladimír Mužík is among the former editor-in-chiefs of the daily who served until April 2011 when Pavel Šafr was appointed editor-in-chief of the paper.  Šafr's tenure ended on 1 May 2013 and Radek Lain became the editor-in-chief of the paper.

Circulation
The circulation of Blesk was 378,000 copies in 2002, making it the best selling newspaper in the country. In October 2003 the paper had a circulation of 485,334 copies and was the most read newspaper in the Czech Republic. Its circulation was 458,000 copies in 2003, making it the best selling newspaper in the country. In December 2004 the paper had a circulation of 500,840 copies. It was 514,000 copies for 2004 as a whole.
 
In 2006, Blesk ranked first with the circulation of 480,000 copies. The 2007 circulation of the paper was 432,170 copies, making it the most read paper in the country. The circulation of Blesk was 435,505 copies in 2008 and 412,238 copies in 2009. It was 384,991 copies in 2010 and 347,566 copies in 2011. In 2012 its circulation was 305,600 copies. In 2013 the paper had the second highest circulation in the country.

See also
 List of newspapers in the Czech Republic

References

External links
 

1991 establishments in Czechoslovakia
Czech-language newspapers
Newspapers published in Prague
Daily newspapers published in the Czech Republic
Publications established in 1991